Federico Gaio and Stefano Napolitano were the defending champions but only Napolitano chose to defend his title, partnering Salvatore Caruso. Napolitano withdrew in the semifinals.

Martin Kližan and Jozef Kovalík won the title after defeating Sander Gillé and Joran Vliegen 6–3, 7–6(7–5) in the final.

Seeds

Draw

References
 Main Draw

BFD Energy Challenger - Doubles